Suresh Chandra Menon a.k.a Suresh Menon is an Indian actor, cinematographer and film director of Tamil and Malayalam films.

Personal life
After meeting the popular actress Revathi during a film shoot of Marumagal Tamil movie (1986), they fell in love and were married in 1986 with the blessings of their parents.  They did not have any children. Though they looked like an ideal couple, differences arose between the two and they decided to amicably separate in 2002. Revathi and Suresh Menon then filed separate petitions, seeking mutual split, before the court. On 22 April 2013 a family court in Chennai granted them mutual divorce considering the fact that they had been living separately for the past 10 years. Revathi said in an interview that they would remain good friends even after the divorce.

Film career
Suresh is known for directing many documentaries and advertisements. Having started his career as cinematographer for the films produced by Sujatha Cine Arts, he directed, produced and played the lead role in the Tamil film Pudhiya Mugam which was released in 1993. His then wife Revathi was the lead heroine in the film. It was both a critical and commercial success. He went on to direct another film Paasamalargal (1994) which was released in 1994. This film also featured Revathi in the lead along with Arvind Swami. Ajith Kumar who later become a popular actor in Tamil cinema played a minor supporting role in the film.

After nearly two decades, Suresh made his acting comeback with Solo (2017).

Filmography

Films
Actor

Director

Television

Cinematographer
Viduthalai (1986)
Marumagal (1986)

References

External links
 

Male actors in Tamil cinema
Tamil film directors
Living people
20th-century Indian film directors
Tamil film cinematographers
20th-century Indian male actors
21st-century Indian male actors
Indian male film actors
Male actors from Kerala
1957 births